Elections to Southwark Council were held in May 1974.  The whole council was up for election. Turnout was 24.2%.

This was the last local election to feature aldermen as well as councillors. Labour got all ten aldermen as well as 56 elected councillors.

Election result

|}

Ward results

Abbey

Alleyn

Bellenden

Bricklayers

Browning

Brunswick

Burgess

Cathedral

Chaucer

College

Consort

Dockyard

Faraday

Friary

Lyndhurst

Newington

Riverside

Rotherhithe

Ruskin

Rye

St Giles

The Lane

Waverley

By-Elections

References

Council elections in the London Borough of Southwark
1974 London Borough council elections
20th century in the London Borough of Southwark